The collared blind snake (Habrophallos collaris) is a species of snake in the family Leptotyphlopidae. It was previously placed in the genus Leptotyphlops and then Epictia, until in 2019 a phylogenetic analysis found it couldn't be placed in either genus, and a new genus was created for it. It is monotypic in the genus Habrophallos.

References

Leptotyphlopidae
Reptiles described in 1977
Taxobox binomials not recognized by IUCN